KTU Faculty of Medicine is the first from two medical schools in Trabzon, Turkey. The school is officially founded in 1973 and it is the oldest and largest medical faculty of the Eastern Black Sea region.

Foundation
Dated 4 January 1973, Karadeniz University Faculty of Medicine, 6th faculty of Karadeniz University was founded under the name of Faculty of Medicine and Health Sciences according to the Chapter 1650. In addition to its own divisions, Trabzon Faculty of Medicine, established as a unit of Hacettepe University, was also staffed by the Faculty of Medicine and Health Sciences. Trabzon Faculty of Medicine, once affiliated to Hacettepe University, admitted students in 1976-1977 instructional year and those students continued their education in Hacettepe University. In accordance with the legal decision, issued 41 and dated 20.7.1982, KTU Faculty of Medicine and Health Medicine joined together as Karadeniz University Medicine Faculty.

Divisions
The faculty is composed of three divisions, namely Basic Medical Sciences, Internal Medical Sciences and Surgical Medical Sciences.

References

Karadeniz Technical University
Educational institutions established in 1973
Trabzon
Medical schools in Turkey